Puththi Ketta Manitharellam is a 2021 Sri Lankan Tamil language drama thriller film written and directed by Raj Sivaraj in his feature film directorial debut. The film stars actors who have featured in popular YouTube channels such as Petrol Shed and Poovan Media. It features Aravindan, Athi, Sathiyajith and Thilakshan in pivotal roles. The film was bankrolled by Blackboard International and music is scored by  Poovan Matheesan. The film had its theatrical release on 24 December 2021 and opened to positive reviews. This was also the first major Sri Lankan Tamil film to hit the screens since the release of black comedy film Komaali Kings in 2018.

Cast 

 Aravindan as Arun
 Athi as thiru
 Sathiyajith as Mathan
 Sabil raaj as Vijay Bahubali
 Thilakshan as Ushanth
 Kanna as Kanna
 Sinthuja as Sayanthavi
 Ithayaraj as Siva Sir
 Kokulan as Kiri

Soundtrack
The songs and background score for this film has been composed by Poovan Matheesan a well known indie artist debuting as a  music director for a featured film . This is a debut film for the singers as well. All the lyrics were penned by K.S.Shanthakumar.

Production 
The shooting of the film was predominantly shot and set in Jaffna and the actors were based from Jaffna. The trailer of the film was unveiled on 3 December 2021.

Release 
The film was premiered in various theatres across Jaffna on 24 December, 25 December and 26 December.

References 

Sri Lankan Tamil-language films
2021 directorial debut films
2021 drama films
2021 thriller films